Vinal Technical High School, or Vinal Tech, is a technical high school located in Middletown, Connecticut. It is in the Connecticut Technical High School System. It receives students from many nearby towns. Vinal Tech currently has around 600 students from approximately 27 different towns.

Technologies
In addition to a complete academic program leading to a high school diploma, students attending Vinal Tech receive training in one of the following trades and technologies:

Automotive Collision Repair and Refinishing
Automotive Technology
Carpentry
Criminal Justice and Protective Services 
Culinary Arts
Electrical
Hairdressing and Cosmetology
Heating, Ventilation and Air Conditioning (HVAC)
Information System Technology
Precision Machining Technology
Veterinary Science

Sports
Vinal Tech has a variety of sports available for students to participate in. The school colors of Vinal Tech are blue, yellow, and white.

Baseball
Basketball
Cheerleading
Cross country
Football
Golf
Outdoor track
Rifle team
Soccer
Softball
Volleyball
Wrestling

References

External links
 Official website

Middletown, Connecticut
Public high schools in Connecticut
Educational institutions accredited by the Council on Occupational Education